No 1 Air Force School, Gwalior is a co-educational English medium institution located at its campus at Maharajpur, Gwalior.

History 
Originally christened as Air Force Vidya Bharati School, later renamed to No.1 Air Force School was established on 23 July 1990 with classes I TO VI. The school was upgraded to a Senior Secondary School in the year 1994-95 and was affiliated to Central Board of Secondary Education Delhi.

The school is under the management and control of the Indian Air Force with Air Officer Commanding, Air Force Station, Gwalior, as its chairman. An advisory board consisting of experienced officers and representatives of parents, guides, inculcates and advises on the programs.

School Football team 

The school supports sports like football & basketball. The school football team plays at many different levels. The school also organizes  ARJAN CUP every year, it is a major football event.

Indian Air Force
Primary schools in India
High schools and secondary schools in Madhya Pradesh
Schools in Gwalior
Educational institutions established in 1990
1990 establishments in Madhya Pradesh